Work Rest and Play is an EP by British ska/pop band Madness. The EP was headlined by the song "Night Boat to Cairo", from the band's debut album One Step Beyond.... It entered the UK Singles Chart on 5 April 1980, reaching a high of number 6.

Background
After the release of "My Girl", the band felt that they had exhausted the material from One Step Beyond..., and did not want to release any more singles from the album. However, Dave Robinson, head of Stiff Records, disagreed. Eventually, a compromise was made, and the band decided to release an EP featuring one album track and three new tracks. The "Work Rest and Play" EP was the result.

Content
The EP's success was largely down to "Night Boat to Cairo", which headlined the set and had an accompanying music video. The fourth song, "Don't Quote Me On That", was a commentary on press coverage which had tried to paint the band as racists who supported the National Front. Some of the band's shows had been disrupted by skinhead violence and, in a 1979 NME interview, Madness member Chas Smash was quoted as saying "We don't care if people are in the NF as long as they're having a good time." This was quoted to add to the speculation that Madness was a racist band supporting the National Front, although the band members denied those allegations.

A promotional 12" single was issued in the UK featuring "Don't Quote Me On That" backed with "Swan Lake" from the One Step Beyond... album. The version of "Don't Quote Me On That" is a different, shorter mix from the one eventually used on the UK EP, and seems to have been used in all European countries outside the UK. It can be heard during the opening titles of the Madness film Take It Or Leave It.

The 2010 re-release of the band's first studio album One Step Beyond... includes the three original songs from the Work Rest and Play EP as bonus tracks on a second CD.

International releases
Releases varied. Some countries opted to issue "Night Boat To Cairo" as a two-track 45rpm single, containing a variety of B-sides: in France "Swan Lake"; in Belgium "The Young & The Old" and in Germany "Don't Quote Me On That". In the Netherlands "Night Boat To Cairo" was the B-side and "Tarzan's Nuts" from One Step Beyond... was the A-side of the 45rpm single, this is in addition to the 33rpm EP which was also issued there. In Portugal, the EP featured a different mix of "Night Boat To Cairo".

In the UK 45rpm DJ and jukebox editions were printed up with "Deceives The Eye" as the B-side. In Italy a 33rpm 12" single was released with "Un Passo Avanti" ("One Step Beyond" sung in Italian) and "Night Boat To Cairo" on one side and "The Young & The Old" and "Don't Quote Me On That" on the other.

When Japan released the "Grey Day"-led 6-track 12" EP in 1981, it contained the three 1980-recorded Work Rest & Play EP tracks, two of which were alternate mixes; the aforementioned "Don't Quote Me On That" plus "Deceives The Eye" which ends cleanly without Suggs's echoing, fading vocal.

"Night Boat to Cairo" music video
After the decision to issue the  EP, a promotional music video was needed. However, there was a lack of time before the release, and not enough to make an effective one. As "Night Boat to Cairo" was the leading track from the EP, a music video of the song was created to represent the EP as a whole.

Madness filmed a karaoke type video in front of a blatantly chroma keyed backdrop of an Egyptian pyramid, with the lyrics appearing on screen in "bouncing ball" style as Suggs sang them. During the long instrumental sections of the song, the band often run around the set, marching and performing their signature "Nutty Train".

Despite the video's poor effects and unprofessional feel, it became very popular amongst fans. This is possibly due to the carefree nature and fooling around of the band, probably down to the large amount of alcohol drunk while filming.

Track listing

Personnel
Madness
 Graham 'Suggs' McPherson – lead vocals
 Mike Barson – keyboards
 Chris Foreman – electric guitar
 Mark Bedford – bass guitar
 Lee Thompson – saxophone
 Daniel Woodgate – drums
 Chas Smash – backing vocals, lead vocals on "Don't Quote Me on That".

Notes

External links

1980 debut EPs
Albums produced by Clive Langer
Albums produced by Alan Winstanley
Madness (band) EPs
Stiff Records EPs